Bankovci can refer to one of the following towns:

In Croatia
 Bankovci, Požega-Slavonia County, Croatia
 Bankovci, Virovitica-Podravina County, Croatia

In Serbia
 Bankovci, Serbia